The Popular Front for the Liberation of Palestine (PFLP) is a secular Palestinian Marxist–Leninist and revolutionary socialist organization founded in 1967 by George Habash. It has consistently been the second-largest of the groups forming the Palestine Liberation Organization (the PLO, founded in 1964), the largest being Fatah (founded in 1959).

Ahmad Sa'adat has served as General Secretary of the PFLP since 2001. He was sentenced in December 2006 to 30 years in an Israeli prison. The PFLP currently considers both the Fatah-led government in the West Bank and the Hamas government in the Gaza Strip illegal because elections to the Palestinian National Authority have not been held since 2006. , the PFLP boycotts participation in the PLO Executive Committee and the Palestinian National Council.

The PFLP has generally taken a hard line on Palestinian national aspirations, opposing the more moderate stance of Fatah. It does not recognise the State of Israel, it opposes negotiations with the Israeli government, and favours a one-state solution to the Israeli–Palestinian conflict. The military wing of the PFLP is called the Abu Ali Mustapha Brigades. The PFLP is well known for pioneering armed aircraft-hijackings in the late 1960s and early 1970s.
According to PFLP Politburo member
and former aircraft-hijacker Leila Khaled, the PFLP does not see suicide bombing as a form of resistance to occupation or as a strategic action or policy and no longer carries out such attacks. The PFLP has been designated a terrorist organisation by the United States, Japan, Canada, Australia and the European Union.

From its foundation the PFLP sought superpower patrons, early on developing ties with the Soviet Union, the People's Republic of China, and, at various times, with regional powers such as Syria, South Yemen, Libya, North Korea, and Iraq, as well as with left-wing groups around the world, including the FARC and the Japanese Red Army. When that support diminished or stopped, in the late 1980s and 1990s, the PFLP sought new allies and developed contacts with Islamist groups linked to Iran, despite the PFLP's strong adherence to secularism and anti-clericalism. The relationship between the PFLP and the Islamic Republic of Iran has fluctuatedit strengthened as a result of Hamas moving away from Iran due to differing positions on the Syrian Civil War. Iran rewarded the PFLP for its pro-Assad stance with an increase in financial and military assistance. The PFLP has been accused by Israel of diverting European humanitarian aid from Palestinian NGOs to itself.

History

Arab Nationalist Movement

The PFLP grew out of the Harakat al-Qawmiyyin al-Arab, or Arab Nationalist Movement (ANM), founded in 1953 by George Habash, a Palestinian Christian, from Lydda. In 1948, 19-year-old Habash, a medical student, went to his home town of Lydda during the 1948 Arab–Israeli War to help his family. While he was there, the Israel Defense Forces attacked the city and as a result, most of its civilian population was forced to leave. They marched for three days without food or water until they reached the Arab armies' front lines. Habash finished his medical education in Lebanon at the American University in Beirut, graduating in 1951.

In an interview with US journalist John K. Cooley, Habash identified the Arab defeat by the Zionists as "the scientific society of Israel as against our own backwardness in the Arab world. This called for the total rebuilding of Arab society into a twentieth-century society."

The ANM was founded in this nationalist spirit. "[We] held the 'Guevara view' of the 'revolutionary human being, Habash told Cooley. "A new breed of man had to emerge, among the Arabs as everywhere else. This meant applying everything in human power to the realization of a cause."

The ANM formed underground branches in several Arab countries, including Libya, Saudi Arabia and Kuwait, then still under British rule. It adopted secularism and socialist economic ideas, and pushed for armed struggle. In collaboration with the Palestinian Liberation Army, the ANM established Abtal al-Audah (Heroes of the Return) as a commando group in 1966.

Formation of the PFLP
After the Six-Day War of June 1967, ANM merged in August with two other groups, Youth for Revenge and Ahmed Jibril's Syrian-backed Palestine Liberation Front, to form the PFLP, with Habash as leader.

By early 1968, the PFLP had trained between one and three thousand guerrillas. It had the financial backing of Syria, and was headquartered there, and one of its training camps was based in as-Salt, Jordan. In 1969, the PFLP declared itself a Marxist–Leninist organization, but it has remained faithful to Pan Arabism, seeing the Palestinian struggle as part of a wider uprising against Western imperialism, which also aims to unite the Arab world by overthrowing "reactionary" regimes. It published a newspaper, al-Hadaf (The Target, or Goal), which was edited by Ghassan Kanafani.

Operations
The PFLP gained notoriety in the late 1960s and early 1970s for a series of armed attacks and aircraft hijackings, including on non-Israeli targets. Their Abu Ali Mustapha Brigades also claimed responsibility for several suicide attacks during the Al-Aqsa Intifada. See #Armed attacks of the PFLP below.

Breakaway organizations

In 1967, Palestinian Popular Struggle Front (PPSF) broke away from the PFLP.

In 1968, Ahmed Jibril broke away from the PFLP to form the Syrian-backed Popular Front for the Liberation of Palestine – General Command (PFLP-GC).

In 1969, the Democratic Front for the Liberation of Palestine (DFLP) formed as a separate, ostensibly Maoist, organization under Nayef Hawatmeh and Yasser Abd Rabbo, initially as the PDFLP.

In 1972, the Popular Revolutionary Front for the Liberation of Palestine was formed following a split in PFLP.

The PFLP had a troubled relationship with George Habash's one-time deputy, Wadie Haddad, who was eventually expelled because he refused orders to stop attacks and kidnapping operations abroad. Haddad has been identified in released Soviet archival documents as having been a KGB intelligence agent in place, who in 1975 received arms for the movement directly from Soviet sources in a nighttime transfer in the Sea of Aden.

PLO membership
The PFLP joined the Palestine Liberation Organization (PLO), the umbrella organization of the Palestinian national movement, in 1968, becoming the second-largest faction after Yassir Arafat's Fatah. In 1974, it withdrew from the PLO Executive Committee (but not from the PLO) to join the Rejectionist Front following the creation of the PLO's Ten Point Program, accusing the PLO of abandoning the goal of destroying Israel outright in favor of a binational solution, which was opposed by the PFLP leadership. It rejoined the executive committee in 1981.

In December 1993 PFLP withdrew from the PLO and became one of the ten founding members of the Damascus-based Alliance of Palestinian Forces, eight of which had been members of the PLO, which was opposed to the Oslo Accords process. PFLP withdrew from APF in 1998. Currently, the PFLP is boycotting participation in the PLO Executive Committee and the Palestinian National Council.

In December 2009, around 70,000 supporters demonstrated in Gaza to celebrate the PFLP's 42nd anniversary.

After the Oslo Accords
After the occurrence of the First Intifada and the subsequent Oslo Accords the PFLP had difficulty establishing itself in the West Bank and Gaza Strip. At that time (1993–96) the popularity of Hamas was rapidly increasing in the wake of their successful strategy of suicide bombings devised by Yahya Ayyash ("the Engineer"). The dissolution of the Soviet Union together with the rise of Islamism—and particularly the increased popularity of the Islamist groups Hamas and Palestinian Islamic Jihad—disoriented many left activists who had looked towards the Soviet Union, and has marginalised the PFLP's role in Palestinian politics and armed resistance. However, the organization retains considerable political influence within the PLO, since no new elections have been held for the organisation's legislative body, the PNC.

The PFLP developed contacts at this time with Islamic fundamentalist groups linked to Iranboth Palestinian Hamas, and the Lebanon-based Hizbullaha detour from its avowedly Marxist orientation. The PLO's agreement with Israel in September 1993, and negotiations which followed, further isolated it from the umbrella organization and led it to conclude a formal alliance with the Iranian backed groups.

As a result of its post-Oslo weakness, the PFLP has been forced to adapt slowly and find partners among politically active, preferably young, Palestinians in the West Bank and Gaza, in order to compensate for their dependence on their aging commanders returning from or remaining in exile. The PFLP has therefore formed alliances with other leftist groups formed within the Palestinian Authority, including the Palestinian People's Party and the Popular Resistance Committees of Gaza.

In 1990, the PFLP transformed its Jordan branch into a separate political party, the Jordanian Popular Democratic Unity Party.

Elections in the Palestinian Authority 
Following the death of Yasser Arafat in November 2004, the PFLP entered discussions with the DFLP and the Palestinian People's Party aimed at nominating a joint left-wing candidate for the  Palestinian presidential election to be held on 9 January 2005. These discussions were unsuccessful, so the PFLP decided to support the independent Palestinian National Initiative's candidate Mustafa Barghouti, who gained 19.48% of the vote.

In the municipal elections of December 2005 it had more success, e.g. in al-Bireh and Ramallah, and winning the mayorship of Bir Zeit. There are conflicting reports about the political allegiance of Janet Mikhail and Victor Batarseh, the mayors of Ramallah and Bethlehem; they may be close to the PFLP without being members.

The PFLP is powerful politically in the Ramallah area, the eastern districts and suburbs of Jerusalem and Bethlehem, the primarily Christian Refidyeh district of Nablus, but has far less strength in the rest of the West Bank, and is of little or no threat to the established Hamas and Fatah movements in Gaza.

The PFLP participated in the Palestinian legislative elections of 2006 as the "Martyr Abu Ali Mustafa List". It won 4.2% of the popular vote, winning three of the 132 seats in the Palestinian Legislative Council. Its deputies are Ahmad Sa'adat, Jamil Majdalawi, and Khalida Jarrar. In the lists, its best vote was 9.4% in Bethlehem, followed by 6.6% in Ramallah and al-Bireh, and 6.5% in North Gaza. Sa'adat was sentenced in December 2006 to 30 years in an Israeli prison.

Successors to George Habash
At the PFLP's Sixth National Conference in 2000, Habash stepped down as General Secretary. Abu Ali Mustafa was elected to replace him, but was assassinated on 27 August 2001 when an Israeli helicopter fired rockets at his office in the West Bank town of Ramallah.

After Mustafa's death, the Central Committee of the PFLP on 3 October 2001 elected Ahmad Sa'adat General Secretary. He has held that position, though since 2002 he has been incarcerated in Palestinian and Israeli prisons.

Attitude to the peace process
When it was formed in the late 1960s the PFLP supported the established line of most Palestinian guerrilla fronts and ruled out any negotiated settlement with Israel that would result in two states between the Jordan River and the Mediterranean Sea. Instead, George Habash in particular, and various other leaders in general advocated one state with an Arab identity in which Jews were entitled to live with the same rights as any minority. The PFLP declared that its goal was to "create a people's democratic Palestine, where Arabs and Jews would live without discrimination, a state without classes and national oppression, a state which allows Arabs and Jews to develop their national culture."

The PFLP platform never compromised on key points such as the overthrow of conservative or monarchist Arab states like Morocco and Jordan, the Right of Return of all Palestinian refugees to their homes in pre-1948 Palestine, or the use of the liberation of Palestine as a launching board for achieving Arab unityreflecting its beginnings in the Pan-Arab ANM. It opposed the Oslo Accords and was for a long time opposed to the idea of a two-state solution to the Israeli–Palestinian conflict, but in 1999 came to an agreement with the PLO leadership regarding negotiations with the Israeli government. However, in May 2010, PFLP general secretary Ahmad Sa'adat called for an end to the PLO's negotiations with Israel, saying that only a one-state solution was possible.

In January 2011, the PFLP declared that the Camp David Accords stood for "subservience, submission, dictatorship and silence", and called for social and political revolution in Egypt.

In December 2013, the PFLP stated: "Hamas is a vital part of the Palestinian national movement, and this is the position of the PFLP."

Armed attacks of the PFLP
This is a list of armed attacks attributed to the PFLP. It is not complete.

Armed attacks before 2000

The PFLP gained notoriety in the late 1960s and early 1970s for a series of armed attacks and aircraft hijackings, including on non-Israeli targets:
 The hijacking of El Al Flight 426 from Rome to Lod airport in Israel on 23 July 1968. The Western media reported that the flight was targeted because the PFLP believed Israeli general Yitzhak Rabin, who was Israeli ambassador to the US, was on board. Several individuals involved with the hijacking, including Leila Khaled deny this. The plane was diverted to Algiers, where 21 passengers and 11 crew members were held for 39 days, until 31 August.
 Gunmen opened fire on El Al Flight 253 in Athens about to take off for New York on 26 December 1968, killing one Israelithis prompted a reprisal by Israel destroying airliners in Beirut.
 An attack on El Al Flight 432 passengers jet at Zürich airport on 18 February 1969, killing the co-pilot and wounding the pilot; an Israeli undercover agent thwarted the hijacking after killing the terrorist leader.
 Bombings by Rasmea Odeh and other PFLP members killed 21-year-old Leon Kanner of Netanya and 22-year-old Eddie Joffe on 21 February 1969. The two were killed by a bomb placed in a crowded Jerusalem SuperSol supermarket which the two students stopped in at to buy groceries for a field trip.< The same bomb wounded 9 others. A second bomb was found at the supermarket, and defused. Odeh was also convicted of bombing and damaging the British Consulate four days later. In 1980, Odeh was among 78 prisoners released by Israel in an exchange with the PFLP for one Israeli soldier captured in Lebanon.
 The hijacking of TWA Flight 840 from Los Angeles to Damascus on 29 August 1969 by a PFLP cell led by Leila Khaled, who became the PFLP's most noted recruit. Two Israeli passengers were held for 44 days.
 Three adult Palestinians and three boys aged 14 and 15 years old threw grenades at the Israeli embassies in The Hague, Bonn and the El Al office in Brussels on the same day, 9 September 1969 with no casualties.
 Attack on a bus containing El Al passengers at Munich airport, killing one passenger and wounding 11 on 10 February 1970.
 On 6 September 1970, the PFLP, including Leila Khaled, hijacked four passenger aircraft from Pan Am, TWA and Swissair on flights to New York from Brussels, Frankfurt and Zürich, and failed in an attempt to hijack an El Al aircraft which landed safely in London after one hijacker was killed and the other overpowered; and on 9 September 1970, hijacked a BOAC flight from Bahrain to London via Beirut. The Pan Am flight was diverted to Cairo; the TWA, Swissair and BOAC flights were diverted to Dawson's Field in Zarqa, Jordan. The TWA, Swissair and BOAC aircraft were subsequently blown up by the PFLP on 12 September, in front of the world media, after all passengers had been taken off the planes. The event is significant, as it was cited as a reason for the Black September clashes between Palestinian and Jordanian forces.
 On 30 May 1972, 28 passengers were gunned down at Ben Gurion International Airport by members of the Japanese Red Army in collaboration with the PFLP's Waddie Haddad in what became known as the Lod Airport massacre. Haddad had been ordered to stop planning operations, and ordered the attack without the PFLP's knowledge.
 On 13 October 1977, the PFLP hijacked Lufthansa Flight 181, a Boeing 737 flying from Palma de Mallorca to Frankfurt. After various stopovers the pilot was killed. The remaining passengers and crew were eventually rescued by German counter-terrorism special forces.
 On 12 April 1984 a bus from Tel Aviv was hijacked. Bassam Abu Sharif in Damascus issued a statement in the name of the PFLP claiming responsibility.

 On 8 June 1990 a clash occurred near Shuwayya in South Lebanon in which four members of the PFLP were killed by the South Lebanon Army (SLA).
 On 27 November 1990 five elite Israeli soldiers and two PFLP fighters were killed in the South Lebanon security zone.

Armed attacks after 2000
The PFLP's Abu Ali Mustapha Brigades has carried out attacks on both civilians and military targets during the Al-Aqsa Intifada. Some of these attacks are:
 The killing of Meir Lixenberg, councillor and head of security in four settlements, who was shot while travelling in his car in the West Bank on 27 August 2001. PFLP claimed that this was a retaliation for the killing of Abu Ali Mustafa.
 21 October 2001 assassination of Israeli Minister for Tourism Rehavam Zeevi by Hamdi Quran.

 A suicide bombing in a pizzeria in Karnei Shomron, on the West Bank on 16 February 2002, killing three Israeli teenagers.
 A suicide bombing in Ariel on 7 March 2002, which left wounded but no fatalities.
 A suicide bombing in a Netanya market in Israel, on 19 May 2002, killing three Israelis. This attack was also claimed by Hamas, but the Abu Ali Mustafa Brigades have identified the perpetrator on their website as one of their members.
 A suicide bombing in the bus station at Geha Junction in Petah Tikva on 25 December 2003 which killed four Israelis.
 A suicide bombing in the Jordan Rift Valley on 22 May 2004, which left no fatalities.
 A suicide bombing in the Carmel Market in Tel Aviv on 1 November 2004, which killed three Israeli civilians.
 On 14 April 2009, PFLP militants fired a homemade projectile at the Kerem Shalom border crossing in HaDarom.
 On 23 October 2012, a PFLP roadside bomb targeting an Israel Defense Forces (IDF) patrol near Kibbutz Kissufim, Southern Israel, was detonated. An IDF commander was seriously injured in the blast.
 On 10 November 2012, PFLP militants fired an anti-tank missile towards Karni Crossing near the Gaza Strip, near Nahal Oz. The explosive device struck an Israeli Givati Brigade jeep, injuring four soldiers and destroying the vehicle.
 The PFLP claimed responsibility for the November 2014 Jerusalem synagogue massacre in which four Jewish worshippers and a policeman were killed with axes, knives, and a gun, while seven were injured. The Israeli police concluded the attack was a lone wolf operation.
 On 29 June 2015, the PFLP claimed responsibility for an attack in which Palestinians in a vehicle fired on a passing Israeli car. Four people were injured; one was severely injured and died the next day in hospital.
 Israeli police suspect the PFLP to be responsible for the 2019 murder of Israeli teenager Rina Shnerb.

See also
 Arab Socialist Action Party
 List of political parties in the State of Palestine
 Palestinian domestic weapons production
 Mohamed Boudia, Carlos the Jackal
 Revolutionare Zellen
 Blekingegade Gang
 Islamic Jihad Movement in Palestine

References

Sources
 PLO 75 , PLO 75 , PLO 75  Secret documents regarding 1974 cooperation between the KGB and the PFLP against Israel and arming PFLP(in Russian) from the Soviet Archives V.Bukovsky, Soviet Archive collected by Vladimir Bukovsky

External links
 PFLP website in Arabic
 Interview with imprisoned PFLP General Secretary Ahmad Saadat- Fight Back! News, Summer 2003

 
1967 establishments in the Israeli Military Governorate
Political parties established in 1967
Anti-Zionism in the Palestinian territories
Anti-Zionist political parties
Arab nationalism in the Palestinian territories
Arab nationalist militant groups
Arab nationalist political parties
Communist terrorism
Guerrilla organizations
Marxist parties
National liberation movements
Palestinian militant groups
Palestinian terrorism
Resistance movements
Socialism in the Palestinian territories
Organisations designated as terrorist by Japan
Organizations designated as terrorist by Canada